Boothby may refer to:

People
Boothby (surname)
Boothby Graffoe (comedian) (born James Martyn Rogers in 1962), English comedian, singer, songwriter and playwright

Places
Division of Boothby, an Australian federal electoral district in Adelaide
Cape Boothby, Antarctica

Other uses
Boothby baronets, two titles in the Baronetage of England, one extant
Boothby monument in St Oswald's Church, Ashbourne, England
Boothby (Star Trek), groundskeeper at Starfleet Academy

See also
Boothby Graffoe, Lincolnshire, England
Boothby Pagnell, Lincolnshire, England